Yao, also romanized as Yiu in Cantonese, is one of the most ancient Chinese surnames, the  "Eight Great Xings of High Antiquity". It is also unique that, along with Jiang 姜 it is still in common use in the modern day.  It is listed 101st in the Hundred Family Surnames, and as the 51st most common surname in Mainland China.

Alternate spellings
 Mandarin: Yao
 Cantonese: Yiu
 Min Nan (Hokkien (Fujian)/Teochew): Lao, Lau, Yeow
 Vietnamese: Diêu, Dao
 Korean: Yo
 Japanese: Yō
 Singapore: Yow, Yeo
 Malaysia: Yeow

Prominent people 
 Yao
 Yao Chonghua, the name of Emperor Shun of pre-dynastic China, one of the Three Sovereigns and Five Emperors.
 Yao Chang, founding emperor of the Later Qin Dynasty.
 Andrew Chi-Chih Yao, a Chinese computer scientist and A.M. Turing Award laureate.
 Jianping Yao, Canadian engineer.
 Yao Ming, a retired Chinese professional basketball player.
 Yao Wenyuan, member of the Gang of Four.
 MC HotDog (born name as Yao Chung-jen), a Taiwanese rap artist known for his use of explicit lyrics in his songs.
 Yao Beina, a famous Chinese singer.
 Yao Chen, a famous Chinese actress.
 Yao Jen-to, Vice Chairperson and Secretary-General of Straits Exchange Foundation of the Republic of China
 Yao Leeh-ter, Political Deputy Minister of Education of the Republic of China (2017–2019)
 Yao Mingming, Former member of K-pop group BLK and C-pop Group UNINE
 Yao Wenlong, Malaysia born Singapore actor

 Yiu
 Claire Yiu, a Hong Kong actress.
 Edward Yiu, a Hong Kong scholar and politician.
 Raymond Yiu, a Hong Kong composer.
 Yiu Cheuk Yin, a Hong Kong footballer.
 Yiu Ho Ming, a Hong Kong footballer.
 Yiu Si-wing, a Hong Kong lawmaker.
 Chantel Yiu, a Hong Kong singer and actress.
 Yeow
 Yeow Chai Tiam, Malaysian politician.

References 

Learning of the Chinese culture- the Yao dynasty

Chinese-language surnames
Individual Chinese surnames
Eight Great Surnames of Chinese Antiquity